Aspidogaster limacoides is a species of the trematodes in the family Aspidogastridae.

Distribution 
Distribution of Aspidogaster limacoides include:
 Austria - since 2001

Hosts 
Hosts of Aspidogaster limacoides include:
 Radix balthica
 Barbus barbus

References

External links

Aspidogastrea
Animals described in 1835